This article contains a comprehensive collection of information related to recordings by the Scottish hard rock band, Nazareth.

Studio albums

Live albums
 'Snaz (1981) #83 U.S. #78 UK
 BBC Radio 1 Live in Concert (1991)
 Live at the Beeb (1998)
 Back to the Trenches (2001)
 Homecoming (2002)
 Alive & Kicking (2003)
 The River Sessions Live 1981 (2004)
 Live in Brazil (2007)

Compilation albums
 Greatest Hits (1975) #54 UK (Silver) #1 Canada (Double Platinum), #72 AUS
 Hot Tracks (1976) #120 U.S.
 The Very, Very Best of Nazareth (1984)
 The Ballad Album (1985, CD reissue 1989) - Norway (Platinum)
 The Ballad Album Vol.2 (1990)
 The Singles Collection (1990) 20 track single CD (Castle Communications CCSCD 280) #5017615928020
 From the Vaults (1993)
 The Singles Collection (1994) 19 track single CD (Castle Communications CMC 3090-2) #4010946309026
 Greatest Hits Volume II (1998)
 The Very Best of Nazareth (2001)
 The Ballads (2002)
 Maximum XS (2004)
 Golden Hits Nazareth (2004)
 The Anthology (2009)
 The Singles (2012)

Singles
This list includes only singles released in European and North American markets

Notes:

Videos
 Live in Texas (1981)
 Razamanaz — Live from London (1985)
 Homecoming — Greatest Hits Live in Glasgow (2002)
 From the Beginning (2005)
 Live from Classic T Stage (2005)
 Naza' Live Scottish TV 1980 (2005)
 Live in Brazil (2007)

References

External links
 

Discographies of British artists
Heavy metal group discographies
Rock music group discographies